Salama Abdel Raouf Zenhoum Ismail (born September 30, 1986) is an Egyptian former swimmer, who specialized in breaststroke events. She currently holds three Egyptian records each in the 50, 100, and 200 m breaststroke, and plays simultaneously for Zohour Sporting Club in Cairo, and Dekalb International Training Centre (DITC) in Atlanta, Georgia. She also won a total of four medals (three silver and one bronze) at the 2003 All-Africa Games in Abuja, Nigeria.

Ismail qualified for the women's 100 m breaststroke, as Egypt's only female swimmer, at the 2004 Summer Olympics in Athens. She cleared a FINA B-standard entry time of 1:11.83 from the All-Africa Games in Abuja, Nigeria. She challenged seven other swimmers in heat three, including 15-year-olds Annabelle Carey of New Zealand and Lee Ji-Young of South Korea. She raced to third place by 0.26 of a second ahead of Argentina's Javiera Salcedo, outside her entry time of 1:12.20. Ismail failed to advance into the semifinals, as she placed twenty-eighth overall in the preliminaries.

References

1986 births
Living people
Egyptian female swimmers
Olympic swimmers of Egypt
Swimmers at the 2004 Summer Olympics
Female breaststroke swimmers
Sportspeople from Cairo
African Games medalists in swimming
African Games silver medalists for Egypt
African Games bronze medalists for Egypt
Competitors at the 2003 All-Africa Games